List of active Indian Navy ships is a list of ships in active service with the Indian Navy. In service ships are taken from the official Indian Navy website. As of July 2022, the Indian Navy possesses 2 aircraft carriers, 1 amphibious transport dock, 8 Landing ship tanks, 11 destroyers, 12 frigates, 2 Nuclear-powered ballistic missile submarine, 16 conventionally powered attack submarines, 22 corvettes, 8 Landing Craft Utility, 10 large offshore patrol vessels, 5 fleet tankers and various auxiliary vessels and small patrol boats. For ships no longer in service see List of ships of the Indian Navy and for future acquisitions of the fleet, see future ships of the Indian Navy.

Submarine fleet

Nuclear-powered ballistic missile submarines (SSBN)

Conventionally-powered submarines (SSK)

Surface fleet

Aircraft carriers

Amphibious warfare ships

Destroyers

Frigates

Corvettes

Offshore patrol vessels

Patrol vessels

Patrol boats

Auxiliary fleet

Replenishment ships

Research, survey and tracking vessels

Support ships

Training vessels

Tugboats

Miscellaneous

See also

 Indian navy-related lists
 Aircraft of the Indian Navy
 Future of the Indian Navy
 Indian Coast Guard
 List of Indian naval aircraft
 List of Indian Navy bases
 List of submarines of the Indian Navy
 List of ships of the Indian Navy

 Indian military-related
 India-China Border Roads
 Indian military satellites
 List of active Indian military aircraft
 List of Indian Air Force stations
 List of Indian Navy bases
 India's overseas military bases
 Indian Nuclear Command Authority

 Other related topics
Currently active military equipment by country

Notes

References

External links
 Official Website of the Indian Navy - Indian Naval platforms
 Indian Navy fleet to grow to 160-plus by 2022 

Ships of the Indian Navy
Lists of ships of India
Naval ships of India
Indian Navy ships